Aiphanes hirsuta is a species of flowering plant in the family Arecaceae. It is found in Colombia, Costa Rica, Ecuador, and Panama.

Four subspecies are recognized:

Aiphanes hirsuta subsp. fosteriorum (H.E.Moore) Borchs. & R.Bernal - Colombia, Ecuador
Aiphanes hirsuta subsp. hirsuta - Colombia, Panama, Costa Rica
Aiphanes hirsuta subsp. intermedia Borchs. & R.Bernal - Colombia
Aiphanes hirsuta subsp. kalbreyeri (Burret) Borchs. & R.Bernal - Colombia

References

hirsuta
Neotropical realm flora
Least concern plants
Flora of South America
Flora of Central America
Plants described in 1932
Taxonomy articles created by Polbot
Taxa named by Max Burret